Spy Bahu is an Indian Hindi-language television spy drama series that premiered on 14 March 2022 on Colors TV. It is digitally available on Voot. Produced by Ashvini Yardi under the banner of Viniyard Films, it stars Sana Sayyad and Sehban Azim. The series went off-air on 30 September 2022.

Plot
Mahira Mirza is a young girl from Kashmir, whose parents Sharif and Aayat are killed in a terrorist attack and she gets separated from her brother. She is adopted by Saras and Minal Kotadia, who change her name to Sejal Kotadia. While, her brother Fareed is adopted by Shera and becomes Abhishek Singh.

Yohan Nanda, is the son of rich businessman Arun Nanda, his mother Aarti died when he was young and he hates his step-mother and aunt Veera Nanda. He live with his brothers Shail and Krish, sister Drishti and sister-in-law Shalini. Veera in reality is a terrorist and runs a group named "Mission Azaadi".

Sejal eventually join RAW with the help of S.K. and Tanha. She enters the Nanda mansion in order to spy on Yohan, who is suspected. She eventually learns that Yohan is innocent and Veera is the real culprit. She also learns that her brother, Abhishek is married to Yohan's sister Drishti. Abhishek loses his life in a mission to avenge his family's death, leaving Drishti in deep shock. She later give birth to Fareed's son Aditya.

Veera makes her assistant Ahana enter the Nanda house as fake Mahira. They together prove Sejal as a terrorist and she is arrested. During court's hearing, Sejal's police van is forced to fall off the cliff by Ahana and Sejal is presumed dead.

6 months later
Sejal disguises as Paro and is pregnant. She re-enters the Nanda house faking memory loss. With her constant efforts, Yohan finds out that his mother was killed by Veera. They also found that Veera and Ahana were giving wrong medicines to Drishti. They together decides to expose Veera.

Veera tries to kill Shalini when she finds out her truth. Shalini is however, saved by Yohan and Sejal. Veera plans to kill the Nandas in a blast during Ganpati. But, Sejal saves everyone on time. Veera is exposed and is arrested by SK. Yohan is arrested on false charges of rape, through a plan made by Ahana and Veera.

During the court hearing, Yohan proves himself innocent, but Ahana turns the table around. Veera escapes police custody with Arbaaz's help and SK sir is killed by a bomb planted in the court. Sejal promises to catch Veera. Sejal is finally able to capture Veera who is killed while escaping. Ahana and Arbaaz are arrested.

Sejal is awarded for her bravery. She later gives birth to a baby girl, Hichki. Yohan is asked by Tanha to join as a spy. He and Sejal are assigned their new mission in Lucknow. The show ends on a happy note with Sejal, Yohan and Hichki enjoying their family time.

Cast

Main
 Sana Sayyad as Sejal Kotadia Nanda / Mahira Mirza: Sharif and Aayat's biological daughter; Saras and Minal's adoptive daughter; Fareed's elder sister; Bumba's adoptive elder sister; Yohan's wife; Shail, Drishti and Krish's sister-in-law; Hichki's mother
 Hardika Sharma as Child Mahira Mirza
 Sehban Azim as Yohan Nanda: Arun and Aarti's younger son; Shail's younger brother; Drishti's elder brother; Krish's elder half-brother; Sejal's husband; Veera's nephew and step-son; Hichki's father

Recurring
 Ayub Khan as Arun Nanda: Aarti's widower; Veera's husband; Shail, Yohan, Drishti and Krish's father
 Parineeta Borthakur as Veera Nanda / Sirji: Aarti's younger sister; Arun's second wife; Krish's mother; Shail, Yohan, and Drishti's maternal aunt and step-mother
 Ram Yashvardhan Passi as Shail Nanda: Arun and Aarti's eldest son; Yohan and Drishti's elder brother; Krish's elder half-brother; Shalini's husband
 Nikunj Malik as Shalini Nanda: Shail's wife; Yohan, Drishti and Krish's sister-in-law
 Sayali Salunkhe / Aditi Bhagat as Drishti Nanda Singh: Arun and Aarti's daughter; Shail and Yohan's younger sister; Krish's elder half-sister; Abhishek's wife; Aditya's mother
 Wasim Mushtaq as Fareed Mirza / Abhishek Singh: Sharif and Aayat's biological son; Mahira's younger brother; Shera's adoptive son; Dhristi's husband; Aditya's father (Dead)
 Devashish Chandiramani as Krish Nanda: Arun and Veera's son; Aarti's nephew and step-son; Shail, Yohan and Drishti's younger half-brother 
 Sanjeev Jotangia as Saras Kotadia: Sejal's adoptive father; Minal's husband; Bumba's father
 Bhavana Balsavar as Minal Kotadia: Sejal's adoptive mother; Saras's wife; Bumba's mother
 Shubha Khote as Mrs. Kotadia: Saras's mother; Sejal's adoptive grandmother; Bumba's grandmother 
 Ekagra Dwivedi as Bumba Kotadia: Saras and Minal's son; Sejal's adoptive younger brother 
 Kiran Karmarkar as Suryakant Sharma; RAW officer; one of Sejal's boss 
 Krunal Pandit as Tanha; RAW officer; one of Sejal's boss 
 Sara Khan as Ahana / fake Mahira: Veera's terrorist group member
 Shivendraa Saainiyol as Shera Singh: Nanda's head of security; Abhishek's adoptive father
 Subir Rana as Harsh: Sejal's colleague and a spy
 Aaryaa Sharma as Aarti Nanda: Arun's first wife; Veera's elder sister; Shail, Yohan and Drishti's mother; Krish's maternal aunt and step-mother (Dead) 
 Aafreen Dabestani as Alisha Kapoor: Yohan's former fiancée 
 Manas Shah as Jatin: Sejal's best friend and former fiancé

Cameo appearance
 Kareena Kapoor as narrator in the first episode

Production

Development
Ashvini Yardi roped in actress Kareena Kapoor Khan as the narrator for the promos and the show. On her part, Kapoor said, "Spy Bahu is a fascinating love story that has left me captivated. The audience is going to love Sejal and Yohan's chemistry and enjoy this power-packed show."

Sana Sayyad on her role and shows comparison to Raazi said, "While the story is about an undercover agent, it has nothing to do with Raazi or even Ek Tha Tiger. With our show, we want to pay tribute to the many unnamed detectives, who are no less than soldiers for us. Sejal's flaws make her different. Honestly, I have always wanted to play a RAW agent or a spy and I feel I manifested this project."

Casting
Sana Sayyad was cast to portray Mahira Mirza/Sejal Kotadia opposite Azim. Sana had to gain weight for her role of a spy. Sehban Azim was chosen to portray Yohan Nanda opposite Sayyad. He had to loose 8 kgs for his role of a businessman.

Parineeta Borthakur was cast as the main antagonist Veera Nanda. Wasim Mushtaq was roped in to portray Sejal's brother Fareed/Abhishek. But his track ended within 4 months. In July 2022, Sara Khan entered the show as Ahana.

Filming
The series is set in New Delhi and in Kashmir. It is mainly shot at the Film City, Mumbai. Some initial sequences were shot in Kashmir. The team also shot in Srinagar, including Lal Chowk.

Release
The series promos were released in February 2022, where Kareena Kapoor introduced the characters of Sejal and Yohan. Spy Bahu premiered on 14 March 2022 on Colors TV and digitally on Voot.

Cancellation
The series went off-air on 30 September 2022. Sehban Azim said, "Everyone was obviously sad on the last day of the shoot, as we were expecting the show to run longer. The story was nice and so were the cast and the production house. In fact, even the ratings were decent as compared to other shows on the channel. I think there are more shows in the offing. They might come come up with a 2.0 and I would love to take it up if it's the same team."

Reception

Critical reception
Spy Bahu generally received positive reviews from critics. Rasika Deshpande said, " It is pretty intriguing and keeps you hooked onto it. It looks promising and moreover very interesting. Spy Bahu brings on board something different yet strong on Television after a pretty long time."

Soundtrack

Spy Bahu soundtrack is composed by Lenin Nandi. The series theme music was taken from the 2005 film Salaam Namastes song "My Dil Goes Mmmm". The track "Keh Do Naa" is the theme song of Yohan and Sejal.

Awards and nominations

See also  
List of programmes broadcast by Colors TV

References

External links 
 Spy Bahu at Colors TV
Spy Bahu on Voot

2022 Indian television series debuts
Indian drama television series
Colors TV original programming
Hindi-language television shows
Indian romance television series